Rashid Shami Suwaid (born 5 September 1973) is a Qatari footballer. He competed in the men's tournament at the 1992 Summer Olympics.

References

External links
 

1973 births
Living people
Qatari footballers
Qatar international footballers
Olympic footballers of Qatar
Qatar Stars League players
1992 AFC Asian Cup players
Footballers at the 1992 Summer Olympics
Place of birth missing (living people)
Association football midfielders